Al Fejeij, or Al Fjeij is an oasis in southwestern Libya.

Notes

Populated places in Wadi al Hayaa District
Oases of Libya